"Desperate" Desmond Aloysius Beatty (April 7, 1893 – June 10, 1969) was an American professional baseball player who played two games for the New York Giants.  He played one game at shortstop committing three errors and one game at third base.

References

External links

Major League Baseball outfielders
Baseball players from Baltimore
New York Giants (NL) players
1893 births
1969 deaths
Rochester Hustlers players
New London Planters players
People from Norway, Maine